John Henry Guinness (10 April 1935 – 29 February 1988) was a son of Henry Eustace Guinness and was chairman of Guinness Mahon.

Educated at Eton College, he attained the rank of officer in the Royal Navy. Later, he was named a director of Guinness Peat Group and served as chairman of Guinness and Mahon merchant bank. He married English-born Mary Jennifer Hollwey. They had three children: Ian Richard Guinness (b. 15 March 1961), Gillian Sarah Guinness (b. 8 July 1962) and Tania Caroline Guinness (b. 10 February 1966).

Guinness Kidnapping
In 1986, he was pistol-whipped during his wife's  kidnapping. She was rescued by Garda Síochána later that month. John Henry Guinness died of undisclosed causes on 29 February 1988, aged 52.

References

1935 births
1988 deaths
People educated at Eton College
John Henry
Irish bankers